Just A Touch Of Love is the fourth album by the American funk band Slave, released in 1979. It was the band's second album with the vocals of  Steve Arrington and Starleana Young. Vocalist Curt Jones joined the band at this time. The album reached number eleven on Billboard's Top Soul Albums chart in 1980. The title track was released as a single, reaching the top ten on the Soul Singles chart.

Track listing 
Just A Touch Of Love - (Danny Webster, Mark Adams, Mark Hicks, Raye Turner, Starleana Young, Steve Arrington)  (6:24)
Are You Ready For Love? - (Curt Jones, Danny Webster, Floyd Miller, Mark Adams, Mark Hicks, Raye Turner, Starleana Young, Steve Arrington)  (5:58)
Funky Lady (Foxy Lady) - (James R. Wilson)  (4:33)
Roots - (Curt Jones, Mark Adams, Starleana Young, Steve Arrington, Raye Turner)  (5:00)
Painted Pictures - (Charles Carter, Raye Turner, Steve Washington)  (0:26)
Thank You - (Floyd Miller, Kipper Jones, Mark Adams, Steve Arrington, Steve Washington)  (5:35)
Shine - (Curt Jones, Danny Webster, Mark Adams, Mark Hicks, Starleana Young, Steve Arrington)  (4:58)
Warning - (Mark Adams, Starleana Young, Steve Arrington, Steve Washington)  (3:20)

Charts

Singles

References

External links
 Slave - Just A Touch Of Love at Discogs

1979 albums
Slave (band) albums
Cotillion Records albums